Thomas B. Murray was a member of the Wisconsin State Assembly.

Biography
Murray was born Thomas Byron Murray on May 12, 1938, in Superior, Wisconsin. He graduated from the University of Wisconsin-Superior. Murray served in the United States Army and was an undersheriff. He was married with two children. Murray died on January 6, 1998, in Duluth, Minnesota.

Political career
Murray was a member of the Assembly from 1973 to 1981. Previously, he was a member of the Douglas County, Wisconsin Board of Supervisors. He was a Democrat.

References

Politicians from Superior, Wisconsin
Democratic Party members of the Wisconsin State Assembly
County supervisors in Wisconsin
Military personnel from Wisconsin
United States Army soldiers
University of Wisconsin–Superior alumni
1938 births
1998 deaths
20th-century American politicians